is a Japanese role-playing video game developed by Gust Co. Ltd. Given the project code "A15", it is the 15th game in the official Atelier series and the second installment of the Dusk storyline. Hidari remains as the character designer and the game runs on the LTGL engine. It was released in Japan on 27 June 2013.

An anime adaptation by Studio Gokumi aired from 10 April 2014 to 26 June 2014.

A version for the PlayStation Vita titled Atelier Escha & Logy Plus: Alchemists of the Dusk Sky was released in January 2015 and featured new playable characters, enemies and story events. A release in other territories came the following year.

An enhanced port of the game titled Atelier Escha & Logy: Alchemists of the Dusk Sky DX for Nintendo Switch and PlayStation 4 was released on 25 December 2019 in Japan, and on 14 January 2020 in the West along with an additional Microsoft Windows release worldwide.

Gameplay
Atelier Escha & Logy allows players to choose between two protagonists. The main storyline remains the same regardless of who is chosen, but certain events and endings are only available using a particular protagonist.

With the new synthesis system, the player can combine different items. The two protagonists Escha and Logy use different kinds of tools to synthesize.

Plot
The game's story takes place about four years after the beginning of Atelier Ayesha: The Alchemist of Dusk in a far away place to the west of the Twilight Land where the local administration hires two new alchemists, Escha and Logy as members of their R&D division. While learning the ropes of their new occupation, Escha and Logy gather friends and companions as they unlock the secrets of the nearby ruins and help the citizens in a world that is still recovering from a catastrophic event known as "The Dusk".

Characters

The first protagonist of the game. Escha is often quite quirky and cheerful and often shows her feelings very clearly. She is full of energy and is also a very curious person. Escha works as a government official alongside her partner Logy and performs alchemy using a cauldron to synthesize items.

The second protagonist of the game. Logy is a serious and "down-to-earth" person but is also kind. He has a burn scar on one of his arms, and he seems to avoid talking about his past. Like Escha, he is a government official and is assigned to work with her. Instead of a cauldron, Logy uses specialized tools to assemble new weapons and armor and to disassemble items in order to discover their properties.

Lucille is a new government official educated in medicine, sent to the development project from The Center. She is junior to Escha and Logy within the development team, and address them both with the "senpai" honorific. She is serious about her work and polite, but sometimes she makes big mistakes. She comes from the rich Ernella family.

Escha's cousin, Awin is a balloon-mechanic working in the engineering team. He is responsible for the maintenance of public facilities, carriages, and so on. He's a caring person and admires the adventurer Reyfer Luckberry. Since he is very knowledgeable about mechanical arts, he provides assistance with various sides of investigations.

Reyfer is a sharpshooter and treasure hunter who joins the team in search for ancient relics.

Threia is an archeologist who makes use of the knowledge obtained from her studies to fight. Her uncle is Keithgriff Hazeldine, which she doesn't have a good relationship with.

Returning from the previous game, Linca is a swordswoman and Marion Quinn' bodyguard. She joins the party under Marion's request.

Return from the previous game. Wilbell is traveling, along with Nio, to better improve magic and to search for Ayesha. 

Return from the previous game. Nio is currently traveling with Wilbell and is a traveling apothecary. She is able to sense and communicate with spirits and trying to find her sister by searching the ruins. Escha calls her "Miss Nio" which she told not to call her that because it makes her a little embarrassed.

A young shopkeeper who frequently tries to swindle her customers. 

A brilliant upstart with the government agency.

A very strict official who is in charge of the subdivision's budget.

A government official from a foreign country who leads the development team.

A bartender and a retired government agent with a very strong personality.

Media

Anime
A 12-episode anime television series adaptation, produced by Studio Gokumi and directed by Yoshiaki Iwasaki, aired from 10 April 2014 to 26 June 2014. The anime has been licensed by Sentai Filmworks for streaming and home video release.

Episode list

Manga
The game was adapted into a manga by Chako Abeno. The manga has been running in Dengeki Maoh since the December issue of the magazine, in the year of 2013.

Release
The game was initially released for the PlayStation 3 in Japan on 27 June 2013, with releases for other territories coming out the following year. In early 2015, a PlayStation Vita version was released, with the western versions coming out in early 2016. This port contained new playable characters, enemies and story events. The physical version for North America was available exclusively through a collector's edition sold on NIS America's webstore and the Canadian retailer videogamesplus.ca.

Reception

Atelier Escha & Logy received a score of 85/80/85/80 in the magazine Dengeki PlayStation, the highest average/aggregate score a game in the series has received from that magazine's ratings so far. Outside Japan, the game has generally positive reviews. The IGN comments: "With tons of things to do, things to make, and areas to explore, Atelier Escha & Logy is a nice fusion of alchemy, adventure, and tactics".

Most of the critics praise the idea of choosing between two heroes, the battle, and gameplay tactics. Koei Tecmo reported the game to have sold 100,000 units in Japan alone in their presentation material for the period. The game sold 57,550 copies in its first week, making it the second-best-selling PS3 title in Japan for the week of 24–30 June 2013.

Notes

References

External links 
 
Official Website 
Official Website 
Official website for vita version 

2013 video games
Anime television series based on video games
Gust Corporation games
Nintendo Switch games
PlayStation 3 games
PlayStation 4 games
PlayStation Vita games
Japanese role-playing video games
Sentai Filmworks
Studio Gokumi
Tokyo MX original programming
Koei Tecmo games
Video games developed in Japan
Video games featuring female protagonists
Video games scored by Hiroki Kikuta
Windows games
Video games about witchcraft
E